This is a list of cricketers who have played matches for the Public Works Department cricket team.

 Zaheer Abbas
 Afzaal Ahmed
 Asif Ahmed
 Niaz Ahmed
 Saeed Ahmed
 Tanvir Ahmed
 Masood Akhtar
 Alimuddin
 Khalid Alvi
 Bilal Asad
 Faisal Athar
 Haaris Ayaz
 Sikander Bakht
 Aftab Baloch
 Daulat Zaman
 Anwar Elahi
 Ikram Elahi
 Ijaz Faqih
 Afaq Hussain
 Ijaz Hussain
 Munawwar Hussain
 Iqbal Imam
 Jalal-ud-Din
 Azam Khan
 Bazid Khan
 Imran Khan
 Rashid Khan
 Shahid Mahmood
 Masood-ul-Hasan
 Mufasir-ul-Haq
 Nasim-ul-Ghani
 Rajesh Ramesh
 Abdur Raqib
 Shakeel-ur-Rehman
 Ahmer Saeed
 Tauseef Ahmed

References 

Lists of Pakistani cricketers